The John B. Putnam, Jr. Memorial Collection of Sculpture is a group of outdoor sculptures distributed through the Princeton University campus in Princeton, New Jersey. The collection is made up of works from 20th and 21st century sculptors. In March 1968, President Robert Goheen announced that an anonymous donor gave a $1 million fund for the collection in honor of Princeton alumni John B. Putnam, Jr., Lieutenant U.S.A, who was killed in action during World War II. The works were selected based on a committee of alumni who current or former directors of art museums, and the first 20 were purchased in 1969 and 1970.

The collection was first designed to have only 20 sculptures, but after receiving George Segal's Abraham and Issac, in 1979, the total catalogue increased to 21.  The Princeton University Art Museum describes the collection as "not a static phenomenon" and that "work is underway to identify and purchase or commission works by artists."

List of sculptures

Original twenty 
The following is the twenty original sculptures before later ones were added.

Official additions 
Once the initial collection was finished, the university received George Segal's Abraham and Issac as a gift in 1979. The piece was commissioned for Kent State University in memorial of the 1970 Kent State shootings , but it was deemed too provocative. Segal subsequently donated it to Princeton as it was where he taught sculpture, and it was installed in 1979. The university would continue to receive additional sculptures through purchasing, continued support by the Putnam family through the Mildred Andrews Fund, or as gifts from artists; however, only Segal's work was included in the collection.

Unofficial additions 
The Princeton University Art Museum classifies several other pieces of artwork as falling under either the collection, although no reference to them as official additions can be found. Additionally, while the art museum's map on the Putnam Collection labels Scott Burton's Public Table as part of the collection, no official publication nor the listing on the art museum's website considers it an official component.

Putnam funding 
Several works on campus, while not part of the collection, have received funding from either the Mildred Andrews Fund, like Scott Burton's Public Table, or the John B. Putnam Jr. Memorial Fund, like Doug and Mike Starn's (Any) Body Oddly Propped.

Notes

References

Bibliography

Works cited

External links 
 Orange Key Virtual Tour
 "Strolling Among Sculpture on Campus" by Jennifer Sheppard

Outdoor sculptures in New Jersey
Princeton University Art Museum